Cornell du Preez (born ) is a South African-born rugby union player. His regular playing positions are Flanker, No 8 and currently loose forward, he plays for Toulon in the Top 14 and represents Scotland internationally.

Rugby union career

Early life

Professional career
He was also named in the  squad for the 2013 Super Rugby season. He was released during the 2013 Currie Cup First Division season to join Alan Solomons at Edinburgh Rugby for the 2013–14 season. Du Preez had a successful first season at Murrayfield, racking up 23 appearances and ultimately being named 'Newcomer of the Year'. A serious leg injury sustained in October 2014 during a match against Newport Gwent Dragons saw Du Preez missing a substantial part of the 2014–2015 season. Du Preez was first assigned to Edinburgh Academicals when not in use by Edinburgh Rugby, and in 2015 was assigned to Heriots.

On 13 February 2018 it was announced that Du Preez would leave Edinburgh for English side Worcester Warriors in the Aviva Premiership ahead of the 2018-19 season.

On 16 June 2021, it was confirmed that du Preez has left Worcester to complete his move with French side Toulon in the Top 14 ahead of the 2021-22 season.

International career
Du Preez was part of the South Africa Under-20s team that played at the 2011 IRB Junior World Championship. However, on 13 November 2016 he was called into the Scotland squad for the Autumn International Series as an injury replacement, having qualified for Scotland through the three year residency requirement, although he didn't take part in any match. He was called up again for the 2017 Six Nations Championship, and made his debut against England at Twickenham before gaining his second test cap the following week in the final day victory over Italy. Du Preez made his first international start in November 2017, wearing the Number 8 shirt in a narrow 17-22 defeat to the All Blacks.

References

External links
 Worcester Warriors Profile
 Scottish Rugby Union Profile
 Profile on www.itsrugby.co.uk
 

1991 births
Living people
South African rugby union players
Eastern Province Elephants players
Southern Kings players
Rugby union players from Port Elizabeth
South Africa Under-20 international rugby union players
Edinburgh Rugby players
Worcester Warriors players
Scotland international rugby union players
Edinburgh Academicals rugby union players
Heriot's RC players
Rugby union number eights